The 2001 Iowa State Cyclones football team represented Iowa State University in the Big 12 Conference during the 2001 NCAA Division I-A football season. The team was led by head coach Dan McCarney, in his seventh year, and played their home games at Jack Trice Stadium in Ames, Iowa. They finished the season with a record of seven wins and five losses (7–5 overall, 4–4 in the Big 12) and with a loss to Alabama in the Independence Bowl.

Schedule

Roster

References

Iowa State
Iowa State Cyclones football seasons
Iowa State Cyclones football